Tarsopsylla is a genus of insects belonging to the family Ceratophyllidae.

The species of this genus are found in Europe.

Species:
 Tarsopsylla octodecimdentata (Kolenati, 1863)

References

Ceratophyllidae
Siphonaptera genera